Shell may refer to:

Architecture and design
 Shell (structure), a thin structure
 Concrete shell, a thin shell of concrete, usually with no interior columns or exterior buttresses
 Thin-shell structure

Science

Biology
 Seashell, a hard outer layer of a marine animal, found on beaches, when brought near to the ear one can hear the sound of the ocean. It can also be a small shelter for insects
 Eggshell
 Nutshell
 Exoskeleton, an external covering of some animals
 Mollusc shell
 Bivalve shell
 Gastropod shell
 Shell, of a brachiopod
 Turtle shell

Physics and chemistry
 Electron shell or a principal energy level of electrons outside an atom's nucleus
 Nuclear shell model, a principal energy level of nucleons within an atom's nucleus
 On shell and off shell, quantum field theory concepts depending on whether classical equations of motion are obeyed

Mathematics
 Spherical shell

Organisations
 Shell plc, a British multinational oil and gas company
 Shell USA
 Shell Australia
 Shell Canada
 Shell Nigeria
 Shell corporation, a type of company that serves as a vehicle for business transactions

Computing
 Shell (computing), a type of user interface
 Command-line interface, sometimes referred to as command shell
 List of command-line interpreters, programs occasionally referred to as shells
 Web shell, interface that enables a web server to be remotely accessed
 Read–eval–print loop, also known as a language shell
 Shell account, a user account on a remote server
 Secure Shell, cryptographic network protocol
 Shellsort or Shell sort, a sorting algorithm by Donald Shell
 Shell, an empty expert system

Entertainment
 Shell (film)
 Shell (theater), a curved surface for reflecting sound
 The Shells, a musical group
 "Shells" (Angel), a TV episode
 Shell, a receptacle used in the Shell game

Places
 Shell, Ecuador
 Shell, Wyoming, United States
Shell Lake (disambiguation), several places

Weaponry
 Shell (projectile), an explosive device fired from artillery
 Shotgun shell, a type of shotgun ammunition

Persons with the surname Shell
 Art Shell (born 1946), American football player and coach
 Brandon Shell (born 1992), American football player
Donald Shell (1924–2015), American computer scientist
 Donnie Shell (born 1952), American football player
 George W. Shell (1831–1899), U.S. Representative from South Carolina
 Karl Shell (born 1938), American economist

Other uses
 Racing shell, a watercraft
 Shell (machinery), each half of a two-piece plain bearing

 Coverage shell, the number of defenders guarding the deep portion of the field in American football
Conchiglie, a type of pasta

See also
 Shell suit, a descendant of the tracksuit
 Shel (disambiguation) 
 Shels (disambiguation)
 
 

sv:Skal